Every Time or Everytime may refer to:

Every Time 
 Every Time (album), a 1998 album by Pam Tillis, or its title track
 "Every Time" (Janet Jackson song), 1997
 "Every Time", a 1986 song by the band Münchener Freiheit
 "Every Time", a 1991 song by Dana Dawson
 "Every Time", B-side of the 1993 Orchestral Manoeuvres in the Dark single "Everyday"

Everytime 
 "Everytime" (Tatyana Ali song), 1999
 "Everytime" (Butterfingers song), 2003
 "Everytime", a song by Britney Spears, 2004
 "Everytime" (Ariana Grande song), 2018
 "Ready or Not/Everytime", by A1
 "Everytime", a 1992 song from Tear of Thought by Screaming Jets
 "Everytime", a 2004 song from Restored by Jeremy Camp
 "Everytime", a 2004 song from Still Not Getting Any... by Simple Plan
 "Everytime", a 2012 song from Heal by Loreen
 "Everytime", a 2013 song from You and Me by Shane Filan
 "Everytime", a 1962 song by Louise Cordet
 "Everytime", a 1962 song by Major Lance
 "Everytime", a 1966 song by The Del-Vetts
 "Everytime", a 1978 song by Jigsaw
 "Everytime", a 1997 song by Lustral
 "Everytime", a 2011 song by Jacynthe Millette-Bilodeau

See also